Ingrid van Bergen (born 15 June 1931) is a German film actress. She has appeared in 100 films since 1954. She was born in Free City of Danzig, today Gdańsk, Poland.

Career
Since 1954, Ingrid van Bergen appeared in more than 170 film and television productions. She was a star of German cinema in the 1950s and 1960s, including successful films like the comedy Roses for the Prosecutor (1959). During the early 1960s, the blond-haired actress also appeared as a supporting role in a few international productions, playing a prostitute in Town Without Pity (1961) with Kirk Douglas and appearing in the war film The Counterfeit Traitor (1962) starring William Holden. She also worked as a singer and made some records. She later turned to character roles and is also known for her role in the film  (1985), in which the German band Die Ärzte played an important role. In 2017, Van Bergen made a cameo appearance in Sharknado 5: Global Swarming, the fifth film of the Sharknado film series.

Personal life
On the night of 2–3 February 1977 she shot her lover, the money broker Klaus Knaths, dead. She was charged with murder but was convicted for manslaughter and sentenced to seven years' imprisonment. She was released after five years, because of good behaviour, and was able to continue her acting career.

In 2009 at age 77, she was the winner of Ich bin ein Star – Holt mich hier raus!, the German edition of I'm a Celebrity... Get Me Out of Here!

Selected filmography

 Portrait of an Unknown Woman (1954)
 Des Teufels General (1955)
 Bandits of the Autobahn (1955)
 My Husband's Getting Married Today (1956)
 The Muzzle (1958)
 Wir Wunderkinder (1958)
 My Ninety Nine Brides (1958)
 Iron Gustav (1958)
 The Blue Moth (1959)
 Crime After School (1959)
 Roses for the Prosecutor (1959)
 Triplets on Board (1959)
  (Bumerang) (1960)
  (1960)
 The High Life (1960)
 We Cellar Children (1960)
 The Avenger (1960)
 Town Without Pity (1961)
 The Devil's Daffodil (1961)
 The Counterfeit Traitor (1962)
  (1962)
 Escape from East Berlin (1962)
  (1967)
 The New Adventures of Snow White (1969)
 What Is the Matter with Willi? (1970)
 The Vampire Happening (1971)
 All People Will Be Brothers (1973)
 Vier gegen die Bank (1976, TV film)
 Horror Vacui (1984)
  (1985)
  (1987)
 Pakten (1995)
  (2000, TV film)
 Angst (2003)
 Neues vom Wixxer (2007)
  (2009)
 Sharknado 5: Global Swarming (2017)

Audio drama
 2002: Evelyn Dörr: The Man in the Moon – A Radioballett with Charlie Chaplin. (Dt. Der Mann im Mond - Radio-ballett mit Charlie Chaplin. Piece for Acoustic Stage (in the role of Hedda Hopper) – Regie: Claudia Leist (Radio Drama / Feature – WDR)

References

External links
 

1931 births
Living people
20th-century German actresses
German film actresses
German television actresses
German people convicted of manslaughter
Ich bin ein Star – Holt mich hier raus! winners
Actresses from Gdańsk
Naturalized citizens of Germany
People from the Free City of Danzig